Matteo Orsini or  Matteo Mignano de Orsini (died 1512) was a Roman Catholic prelate who served as Bishop of Calvi Risorta (1505–1512)
and Bishop of Città Ducale (1502–1505).

Biography
On 24 January 1502, Matteo Orsini was appointed during the papacy of Pope Alexander VI as Bishop of Città Ducale.
On 8 November 1505, he was appointed during the papacy of Pope Julius II as Bishop of Calvi Risorta.
He served as Bishop of Calvi Risorta until his death in 1512.

References

External links and additional sources
 (for Chronology of Bishops) 
 (for Chronology of Bishops) 
 (for Chronology of Bishops) 
 (for Chronology of Bishops) 

16th-century Italian Roman Catholic bishops
Bishops appointed by Pope Alexander VI
Bishops appointed by Pope Julius II
1512 deaths